Costel Orac (born 22 January 1959) is a Romanian retired footballer and current coach.

Club career
Costel Orac was born on 22 January 1959 in Galați. He made his Divizia A debut on 22 August 1976, playing for FCM Galați in a 1–0 loss against Jiul Petroșani. He played 5 seasons in the first two leagues for FCM Galați, after which he was transferred at Dinamo București together with teammate Nicușor Vlad. In his first three seasons spent at the club, he won the Divizia A title in all of them, in the first he contributed with 9 goals scored in 32 matches, in the second he played 30 games and scored 4 goals and in the third he made 23 appearances and scored 5 goals. Orac also won three Cupa României with the Red Dogs and appeared in 26 matches in which he scored 5 goals in European competitions, including helping the team eliminate Inter Milan by scoring the decisive goal of the 3–2 victory from the second leg in the 1981–82 UEFA Cup season and appeared in 7 games in which he scored two goals against Hamburg and Liverpool in the 1983–84 European Cup as the club reached the semi-finals. In 1989, Orac alongside teammates Dumitru Moraru and Alexandru Nicolae were transferred from Dinamo to Victoria București where because of a conflict he had with coach Florin Halagian, he played only two Divizia A games in which he scored one goal and made one appearance in the 1989–90 UEFA Cup in which he gave an assist in a 1–1 against Valencia. After the 1989 Romanian Revolution, Orac went to play in the Nationalliga B where he was recommended by coach Mircea Lucescu to Étoile Carouge's coach Radu Nunweiller. In Switzerland, after a injury, Orac found out at a medical control that he has problems with his back, he returned to play at Dinamo for a short while, making his last appearance in Divizia A on 11 May 1991 in a 1–1 against Universitatea Craiova after which he went to play in Divizia B at Unirea Focșani where he retired after playing one season. During his whole career, Costel Orac played 308 Divizia A matches in which he scored 54 goals and made 27 appearances in which he scored 5 goals in European competitions.

International career
Costel Orac played three friendly games at international level for Romania, making his debut on 29 July 1984 under coach Mircea Lucescu in a 4–2 victory against China in which he scored one goal. His following two games were a 1–1 and a 0–0 against Iraq.

International stats

International goals
Romania's goal tally first.

Managerial career
Costel Orac started his coaching career while he was still an active player, being an assistant at Unirea Focșani in the 1991–92 Divizia B. From the 1992–93 Divizia B season, he began his career as a head coach at Unirea Focșani and in 1996 he had his only coaching experience outside Romania, for one season and a half in the Cypriot First Division at Alki Larnaca. He spent most of his career coaching in Divizia B, having a total of 356 games, managing to win four promotions to the first league with Selena Bacău, Baia Mare, Unirea Urziceni and Concordia Chiajna. Costel Orac has a total of 73 matches managed in Divizia A and in 2009 he was Dario Bonetti's assistant at Dinamo for a few months.

Personal life
His nephew, Daniel Orac was also a footballer.

Honours

Player
FCM Galați
Divizia B: 1978–79
Dinamo București
Divizia A: 1981–82, 1982–83, 1983–84
Cupa României: 1981–82, 1983–84, 1985–86

Coach
Selena Bacău
Divizia B: 1994–95

References

External links

Costel Orac manager profile at Labtof.ro

1959 births
Living people
Sportspeople from Galați
Romanian footballers
Association football forwards
Romania international footballers
Liga I players
Liga II players
FCM Dunărea Galați players
FC Dinamo București players
Victoria București players
Étoile Carouge FC players
CSM Focșani players
Romanian expatriate footballers
Romanian expatriate sportspeople in Switzerland
Expatriate footballers in Switzerland
Romanian football managers
FCM Bacău managers
Alki Larnaca FC managers
FC Brașov (1936) managers
FC Bihor Oradea managers
CS Minaur Baia Mare (football) managers
ASC Oțelul Galați managers
FC Botoșani managers
FC Unirea Urziceni managers
CS Otopeni managers
CS Concordia Chiajna managers
Romanian expatriate football managers
Expatriate football managers in Cyprus
Romanian expatriate sportspeople in Cyprus